Bingo is the first solo album by German musician Bela B, released in 2006.

The song "Lee Hazlewood & das erste Lied des Tages" is also featured on the Lee Hazlewood album Cake or Death as "The First Song of the Day".

Track listing
Songwriters are listed in brackets:
 "B-Vertüre" (B-verture) (M: Eric Babak/T: Felsenheimer) - 1:22
 "Theme from Bingowings" - hidden track before "B-Vertüre", hearable by rewinding to -1:10.
 "Gitarre runter" (Guitar down) (M/T: Felsenheimer) - 3:46
 "Tag mit Schutzumschlag" (The day with the dust cover) (M: Bruhn, Felsenheimer/T: Felsenheimer) - 3:06
 "Irgendetwas bleibt" (Something stays) (M: Stülpner, Jackson/T: Felsenheimer) - 3:30
 "Traumfrau" (Dream woman) (M: Stülpner, Bruhn, Jackson, Felsenheimer/T: Stülpner, Felsenheimer) - 3:07
 "Letzter Tag" (Last day) (M/T: Felsenheimer) - 4:13
 "Was ist nur los...?" (What's the matter...?) (M/T: Felsenheimer) - 2:34
 "1. 2. 3. ..." (feat. Charlotte Roche) (M: Jackson, Bruhn/T: Jackson, Felsenheimer) - 3:03
 "Sie hat was vermisst" (She missed something) (M/T: Felsenheimer) - 4:06
 "Der Vampir mit dem Colt" (The vampire with a colt) (M/T: Felsenheimer) - 4:48
 "Versuchs doch mal mit mir" (Why don't you try me for once) (M: Ludwig/T: Felsenheimer) - 3:07
 "Lee Hazlewood & das erste Lied des Tages" (Bela B and Lee Hazlewood) (The first song of the day) (M: Quidde, Stülpner, O’Ryan/T: Felsenheimer) - 3:11
 "Hab keine Angst" (feat. Lula) (Have no fear) (M: Quidde, Stülpner, O’Ryan/T: Felsenheimer, Stülpner) - 3:55
 "ZappingsonG" (Channel-surfing-sonG) (M/T: Felsenheimer) - 2:08
 "Wiehr thind sssuper" (We are super) (M: Bruhn, Stülpner/T: Felsenheimer, Stülpner, Jackson) - 3:17
 "Baby läuft fort" (Baby runs away) (M: Quidde, Stülpner, Jackson/T: Felsenheimer, Stülpner) - 3:49
 "Traumfrau again" (M: Stülpner/T: Stülpner, Felsenheimer) - 1:05

Singles
2006: "Tag mit Schutzumschlag"
2006: "1. 2. 3. ..."
2006: "Sie hat was vermisst"
2007: "Gitarre runter"

Personnel

Bela B - vocals, drums, guitars 
Olsen Involtini - guitars, keyboards, vocals
Wayne Jackson - guitars, keyboards, vocals 
Holly Burnette - bass
Lula - additional vocals
Davide Rossi - string arrangements, performance
 - co-composer & arranger

2006 albums
Bela B. albums